Phyllidiella pustulosa, the pustulose wart slug, pimpled phyllidiella, or pustulose phyllidiella, is a species of sea slug, a dorid nudibranch, in the family Phyllidiidae.

Distribution 
This species was described from specimens collected in Timor. It is one of the most common nudibranchs throughout the tropical Indo-West Pacific. However, a study using DNA sequencing of the CO1 gene has shown that it is a species complex.

Description
Although this nudibranch changes appearance as it grows, three median clusters of (usually) pink tubercles remain the same, except that they are amalgamated in juveniles and separated in large animals. These tubercles can range in color from pink to green to white. The intensity of the pink coloration and green-grey tones may possibly be related to diet, and the length of time since last feeding. Other distinguishing features are the pale pink edge of the mantle, the broad, triangular, black tipped oral tentacles and the rhinophoral clavus possessing 22 to 26 lamellae (in specimens greater than 35 mm).

References

Further reading
 Litvaitis M.K. & Newman L.J., 2002. Color, Color Patterns and Mimicry. 
 Newman, L.J.; Cannon, L.R.G.; Brunckhorst, D.J. 1994. A new flatworm (Platyhelminthes Polycladida) which mimics a Phyllidiid nudibranch (Mollusca, Nudibranchia). Zool. J. Linn. Soc. 110(1): 19-25. [publ. not seen by RFB]
 Newman, Leslie & Lester Cannon. 2003. Marine Flatworms: The World of Polyclads. vii + 112 pp. CSIRO Publishing.
 Rudman, W.B., 1998 (June 25). Mimicry - Phyllidiella, flatworms, Chromodoris [In] Sea Slug Forum.
 Rudman, W.B., 1999 (July 11). Comment on About Mimicry & flatworms by Christine. [Message in] Sea Slug Forum. 
 Seifarth, W. 2004. Marine Flatworms of the World. http://www.rzuser.uni-heidelberg.de/~bu6/flatintr.htm]

External links
 

Phyllidiidae
Gastropods described in 1804
Taxa named by Georges Cuvier